Kendra Lara, formerly Hicks, is a Dominican American politician. She currently serves on the Boston City Council for the 6th district and is a member of the Democratic party. Hicks is a socialist.

Electoral results

References

External links

Boston City Council members
American politicians of Dominican Republic descent
American democratic socialists
Dominican Republic emigrants to the United States
Hispanic and Latino American city council members
Hispanic and Latino American women in politics
Massachusetts Democrats
Year of birth missing (living people)
Living people
Women city councillors in Massachusetts
21st-century American politicians
21st-century American women politicians
Hispanic and Latino American people in Massachusetts politics